David Eric Grohl (born January 14, 1969) is an American musician. He is the founder of the rock band Foo Fighters, in which he is the lead singer, guitarist, and principal songwriter. Prior to forming Foo Fighters, he was the drummer of grunge band Nirvana from 1990 to 1994.

At 17, Grohl joined the punk rock band Scream after the departure of their drummer Kent Stax. Grohl became the drummer for Nirvana after Scream broke up in 1990. Nirvana's second album, Nevermind (1991), was the first to feature Grohl on drums and became a worldwide success. After Nirvana disbanded following the death of lead singer Kurt Cobain in April 1994, Grohl formed Foo Fighters as a one-man project. The first Foo Fighters album was released in 1995, and a full band was assembled to tour and record under the Foo Fighters name; they have released 10 studio albums.

Grohl is the drummer and co-founder of the rock supergroup Them Crooked Vultures, and has recorded and toured with Queens of the Stone Age. He has also participated in the side projects Late! and Probot. Grohl began directing Foo Fighters music videos in 1997 and released his debut documentary, Sound City, in 2013. It was followed by the documentary miniseries Sonic Highways (2014) and the documentary film What Drives Us (2021). In 2021, Grohl released an autobiography, The Storyteller: Tales of Life and Music. In 2022, Grohl and the Foo Fighters starred as themselves in the comedy horror film Studio 666.

In 2010, he was described by Classic Rock Drummers co-author Ken Micallef as one of the most influential rock musicians of the last 20 years. Grohl was inducted into the Rock and Roll Hall of Fame as part of Nirvana in 2014 and as a member of Foo Fighters in 2021.

Early life
David Eric Grohl was born in Warren, Ohio, on January 14, 1969, the son of teacher Virginia Jean (née Hanlon) and newswriter James Harper Grohl (19382014). He is of German, Irish, and Slovak descent. In addition to being an award-winning journalist, James had also served as the special assistant to Senator Robert Taft Jr. and was described as "a talented political observer who possessed the ability to call every major election with uncanny accuracy". When he was a child, Grohl's family moved to Springfield, Virginia. When he was seven, his parents divorced, and he was subsequently raised by his mother. At the age of 12, he began learning to play guitar. He grew tired of lessons and instead taught himself, eventually playing in bands with friends. He said, "I was going in the direction of faster, louder, darker while my sister, Lisa, three years older, was getting seriously into new wave territory. We'd meet in the middle sometimes with Bowie and Siouxsie and the Banshees."

At 13, Grohl and his sister spent the summer at their cousin Tracey's house in Evanston, Illinois. Tracey introduced them to punk rock by taking the pair to shows by a variety of punk bands. His first concert was Naked Raygun at The Cubby Bear in Chicago in 1982. Grohl recalled, "From then on we were totally punk. We went home and bought Maximumrocknroll and tried to figure it all out." In Virginia, he attended Thomas Jefferson High School as a freshman and was elected class vice-president. In that capacity, he managed to play pieces of songs by punk bands like Circle Jerks and Bad Brains over the school intercom before his morning announcements. His mother decided he should transfer to Bishop Ireton High School in Alexandria because his cannabis use was lowering his grades. He stayed there for two years, beginning with a repeat of his first year. After his second year, he transferred yet again to Annandale High School. While in high school, he played in several local bands, including a stint as guitarist in a band called Freak Baby. During this period, he taught himself to play drums. When Freak Baby fired its bass player and reshuffled its lineup, Grohl switched to drums. The reconstituted band renamed itself Mission Impossible.

Grohl said he did not take drumming lessons and instead learned by listening to Rush and punk rock. Rush drummer Neil Peart was an early influence: "When I got 2112 when I was eight years old, it fucking changed the direction of my life. I heard the drums. It made me want to become a drummer." During his developing years as a drummer, Grohl cited John Bonham as his greatest influence, and eventually had Bonham's three-rings symbol tattooed on his right shoulder. Mission Impossible rebranded themselves Fast before breaking up, after which Grohl joined the hardcore punk band Dain Bramage in December 1985. Dain Bramage ended in March 1987 when Grohl quit without warning to join Scream, having produced the I Scream Not Coming Down LP. Many of Grohl's early influences were at the 9:30 Club, a music venue in Washington, DC. He said, "I went to the 9:30 Club hundreds of times. I was always so excited to get there, and I was always bummed when it closed. I spent my teenage years at the club and saw some shows that changed my life."

Career

Scream (1986–1990) 

As a teenager in DC, Grohl briefly contemplated joining shock-rockers Gwar, who were looking for a drummer. At age 17, Grohl auditioned with local Washington, D.C., favorites Scream to fill the vacancy left by the departure of drummer Kent Stax. In order to be considered for the position, Grohl lied about his age, claiming he was older. To Grohl's surprise, the band asked him to join, so he dropped out of high school in his junior year. He has been quoted as saying, "I was 17 and extremely anxious to see the world, so I did it."

Over the next four years, Grohl toured extensively with Scream, recording a live album (their show of May 4, 1990, in Alzey, Germany, being released by Tobby Holzinger as Your Choice Live Series Vol.10) and two studio albums, No More Censorship and Fumble, on which Grohl penned and sang vocals on the song "Gods Look Down". During a Toronto stop on their 1987 tour, Grohl played drums for Iggy Pop at a CD release party held at famed club the El Mocambo. In 1990, Scream unexpectedly disbanded midtour following the departure of bassist Skeeter Thompson.

Nirvana (1990–1994)

While playing in Scream, Grohl became a fan of the Melvins and eventually befriended them. During a 1990 tour stop on the West Coast, Melvins guitarist Buzz Osborne took his friends Kurt Cobain and Krist Novoselic, of the band Nirvana, to see Scream. Following the breakup of Scream, Grohl called Osborne for advice. Osborne informed him that Nirvana was looking for a drummer and gave Grohl the phone numbers of Cobain and Novoselic, who invited Grohl to Seattle to audition. Grohl passed the audition and soon joined the band. Novoselic later said, "We knew in two minutes that he was the right drummer." Grohl told Q: "I remember being in the same room with them and thinking, 'What? That'''s Nirvana? Are you kidding?' Because on their record cover they looked like psycho lumberjacks... I was like, 'What, that little dude and that big motherfucker? You're kidding me'."

When Grohl joined Nirvana, the band had already recorded several demos for the follow-up to their debut album Bleach, having spent time recording with producer Butch Vig in Wisconsin. Initially, the plan was to release the album on Sub Pop, but the band received a great deal of interest based on the demos. Grohl spent the initial months with Nirvana traveling to various labels as the band shopped for a deal, eventually signing with DGC Records. In the spring of 1991, the band entered Sound City Studios in Los Angeles to record Nevermind (as seen in Grohl's 2013 documentary Sound City).Nevermind (1991) exceeded all expectations and became a worldwide commercial success. At the same time, Grohl was compiling and recording his own material, which he released on a cassette called Pocketwatch in 1992 on indie label Simple Machines. Rather than using his own name, Grohl released the cassette under the pseudonym "Late!"

In the later years of Nirvana, Grohl's songwriting contributions increased. In Grohl's initial months in Olympia, Cobain overheard him working on a song called "Color Pictures of a Marigold", and the two subsequently worked on it together. Grohl would later record the song for the Pocketwatch cassette. Grohl stated in a 2014 episode of Foo Fighters: Sonic Highways that Cobain reacted by kissing him upon first hearing a demo of "Alone + Easy Target" that Grohl had recently recorded.

During the sessions for In Utero, Nirvana decided to re-record "Color Pictures of a Marigold" and released this version as a B-side on the "Heart-Shaped Box" single, titled simply "Marigold". Grohl also contributed the main guitar riff for "Scentless Apprentice". Cobain admitted in a late 1993 MTV interview that he initially thought the riff was "kind of boneheaded", but was gratified at how the song developed (a process captured in part in a demo on the Nirvana box set With the Lights Out). Cobain said that he was excited at the possibility of having Novoselic and Grohl contribute more to the band's songwriting.

Prior to their 1994 European tour, the band scheduled session time at Robert Lang Studios in Seattle to work on demos. For most of the three-day session, Cobain was absent, so Novoselic and Grohl worked on demos of their own songs. They completed several of Grohl's songs, including future Foo Fighters songs "Exhausted", "Big Me", "February Stars", and "Butterflies". Cobain arrived on the third day and the band recorded a demo of "You Know You're Right". It was Nirvana's final studio recording; on April 8, 1994, Cobain was found dead of a self-inflicted shotgun wound at his home. Two decades later, on April 10, 2014, Grohl was inducted into the Rock and Roll Hall of Fame as a member of Nirvana.

 Foo Fighters (1994–present) 

Grohl's initial post-Nirvana activity
Following Cobain's death in April 1994, Grohl retreated, unsure what to do. In October 1994, he scheduled studio time at Robert Lang Studios, and quickly recorded a fifteen-track demo. With the exception of a single guitar part on "X-Static" played by Greg Dulli of the Afghan Whigs, Grohl performed all of the instruments himself.

Grohl wondered if his future might be in drumming for other bands. In November, Grohl took a brief turn with Tom Petty and the Heartbreakers, including a performance on Saturday Night Live. He declined an invitation to become Petty's permanent drummer. Grohl was also rumored as a possible replacement for Pearl Jam drummer Dave Abbruzzese and performed with the band for a song or two at three shows during Pearl Jam's March 1995 Australian tour. However, by then, Pearl Jam had already settled on ex-Red Hot Chili Peppers drummer Jack Irons, and Grohl had other solo plans.
1994-1996- Foo Fighters' first albums
Grohl's demo received interest from major labels. Nirvana's A&R rep Gary Gersh was now president of Capitol Records and lured Grohl to sign with the label. Grohl did not want the effort to be considered the start of a solo career, so he recruited other band members: former Germs and touring Nirvana guitarist Pat Smear and two members of the recently disbanded Sunny Day Real Estate, William Goldsmith (drums) and Nate Mendel (bass). He and Novoselic decided against Novoselic joining; Grohl said it would have felt "really natural" for them to work together again, but would have been uncomfortable for the other band members and placed more pressure on Grohl. Rather than re-record the album, Grohl's demo was mixed by Rob Schnapf and Tom Rothrock and was released in July 1995 as Foo Fighters' self-titled debut album. During a break between tours, the band entered the studio and recorded a cover of Gary Numan's "Down in the Park". In February 1996, Grohl and his then-wife Jennifer Youngblood made a brief cameo appearance on The X-Files third-season episode "Pusher".

After touring for the self-titled album for more than a year, Grohl returned home and began work on the soundtrack to the 1997 movie Touch. Grohl performed all of the instruments and vocals himself, save for vocals from Veruca Salt singer Louise Post on the title track, keyboards by Barrett Jones (who also co-produced the record) on one track, and vocals and guitar by X's John Doe on "This Loving Thing (Lynn's Song)". Grohl completed the recording in two weeks, and immediately joined Foo Fighters to work on their follow-up.

During the initial sessions for Foo Fighters' second album, tension emerged between Grohl and drummer William Goldsmith. According to Goldsmith, "Dave had me do 96 takes of one song, and I had to do thirteen hours' worth of takes on another one ... It just seemed that everything I did wasn't good enough for him, or anyone else". Goldsmith also believed that Capitol and producer Gil Norton wanted Grohl to drum on the album. With the album seemingly complete, Grohl headed home to Virginia with a copy of the rough mixes and found himself unhappy with the results. He wrote and recorded a few new songs, "Walking After You" and the hit single “Everlong”, alone at a studio in Washington, D.C. Inspired by the session, Grohl opted to move the band, without Goldsmith's knowledge, to Los Angeles to re-record most of the album with Grohl on drums. After the sessions were complete, Goldsmith announced his departure from the band. Grohl later expressed regret, and said that "there were a lot of reasons it didn't work out, but there was also a part of me that was like, you know, I don't know if I'm finished playing the drums yet".

The second Foo Fighters album, The Colour and the Shape, was released in May 1997 and cemented Foo Fighters as a staple of rock radio. It produced several hit singles, including "Everlong", "My Hero", and "Monkey Wrench". Prior to the album's release, former Alanis Morissette drummer Taylor Hawkins joined on drums. The following September, Smear left the band, citing a need to settle down following a lifetime of touring. Smear was replaced by Grohl's former Scream bandmate Franz Stahl. Stahl was fired prior to recording of Foo Fighters' third album and was replaced by touring guitarist Chris Shiflett, who later became a full-fledged member during the recording of One by One.

1999–2005
Grohl's life of non-stop touring and travel continued with Foo Fighters' popularity. During his infrequent pauses he lived in Seattle and Los Angeles before returning to Alexandria, Virginia. It was there that he turned his basement into a recording studio where the 1999 album There Is Nothing Left to Lose was recorded. It was recorded following the departure from Capitol and their former president Gary Gersh. Grohl described the recording experience as "intoxicating at times" because the band members were left completely to their own devices. He added, "One of the advantages of finishing the record before we had a new label was that it was purely our creation. It was complete and not open to outside tampering."

In 2000, the band recruited Queen guitarist Brian May to add some guitar flourish to a cover of Pink Floyd's "Have a Cigar", a song which Foo Fighters previously recorded as a B-side. The friendship between the two bands resulted in Grohl and Taylor Hawkins being asked to induct Queen into the Rock and Roll Hall of Fame in 2001. Grohl and Hawkins joined May and Queen drummer Roger Taylor to perform "Tie Your Mother Down", with Grohl standing in on vocals for Freddie Mercury. May later contributed guitar work for the song "Tired of You" on the ensuing Foo Fighters album, as well as on an unreleased Foo Fighters song called "Knucklehead".

Near the end of 2001, Foo Fighters returned to the studio to work on their fourth album. After four months in the studio, with the sessions finished, Grohl accepted an invitation to join Queens of the Stone Age and helped them to record their 2002 album Songs for the Deaf. (Grohl can be seen drumming for the band in the video for the song "No One Knows".) After a brief tour through North America, Britain and Japan with the band and feeling rejuvenated by the effort, Grohl recalled the other band members to completely re-record their album at his studio in Virginia. The effort became their fourth album, One by One. While initially pleased with the results, in another 2005 Rolling Stone interview, Grohl admitted to not liking the record: "Four of the songs were good, and the other seven I never played again in my life. We rushed into it, and we rushed out of it."

On November 23, 2002, Grohl achieved a historical milestone by replacing himself on the top of the Billboard modern rock chart, when "You Know You're Right" by Nirvana was replaced by "All My Life" by Foo Fighters. When "All My Life" ended its run, after a one-week respite, "No One Knows" by Queens of the Stone Age took the number one spot. Between October 26, 2002, and March 1, 2003, Grohl was in the number one spot on the Modern rock charts for 17 of 18 successive weeks, as a member of three different groups.
2005–2009

Grohl and Foo Fighters released their fifth album In Your Honor on June 14, 2005. Prior to starting work on the album, the band spent almost a year relocating Grohl's home-based Virginia studio to a brand new facility, dubbed Studio 606, located in a warehouse near Los Angeles. Featuring collaborations with John Paul Jones of Led Zeppelin, Josh Homme of Queens of the Stone Age and Norah Jones, the album was a departure from previous efforts, and included one rock and one acoustic disc.

Foo Fighters' sixth studio album Echoes, Silence, Patience & Grace was released on September 25, 2007. It was recorded during a three-month period between March 2007 and June 2007, and its release was preceded by the first single "The Pretender" on September 17. The second single, "Long Road to Ruin", was released on December 3, 2007, followed by the third single, "Let It Die", on June 24, 2008.

On November 3, 2009, Foo Fighters released their first Greatest Hits collection, consisting of 16 tracks including a previously unreleased acoustic version of "Everlong" and two new tracks "Wheels" and "Word Forward" which were produced by Nevermind's producer Butch Vig. Grohl said he felt the Greatest Hits was too early and "can look like an obituary". He did not feel they had written their best hits yet.
2010–2014
Foo Fighters' seventh studio album, Wasting Light, was released on April 12, 2011. It became the band's first album to reach No. 1 in the United States. Despite rumors of a hiatus, Grohl confirmed in January 2013 that the band had completed writing material for their follow-up to Wasting Light.

Grohl and members of Foo Fighters sometimes perform as a cover band "Chevy Metal", as they did in May 2015 at "Conejo Valley Days", a county fair in Thousand Oaks, California.

On November 10, 2014, Foo Fighters released their eighth studio album, Sonic Highways, which reached number two in the United States. The album features eight songs, each inspired by a different U.S. city's musical history and culture researched by Grohl himself.
2015–present

On June 12, 2015, while playing a show in Gothenburg, Sweden, Grohl fell off the stage, breaking his leg. He left temporarily and returned with a cast to finish the concert. Afterward, the band cancelled the remainder of its European tour. To avoid having to cancel the band's upcoming North American tour, Grohl designed a large "elevated throne" which would allow him to perform on stage with a broken leg. The throne was unveiled at a concert in Washington, D.C. on July 4, where Grohl used the stage's video screens to show the crowd video of him falling from the stage in Gothenburg as well as X-rays of his broken leg. Beginning with the show on July 4, Foo Fighters began selling new tour merchandise rebranding the band's North American tour as the Broken Leg Tour. In 2016, Grohl lent his throne to Axl Rose of Guns N' Roses after Rose broke his foot. He lent it again in 2021 to Darin Wall, of the Seattle metal band Greyhawk, after Wall was shot in the leg.

On July 31, 2015, Grohl posted a personal reply to Fabio Zaffagnini, Marco Sabiu, and the 1,000 participants of the "Rockin' 1000" project in Cesena, Italy, thanking them for their combined performance of the Foo Fighters' song "Learn to Fly" from their 1999 album There Is Nothing Left to Lose, indicating (in broken Italian), "... I promise [Foo Fighters will] see you soon". On November 3, Foo Fighters performed in Cesena, where Grohl invited some "Rockin' 1000" members onto the stage to perform with the band.

On September 15, 2017, Foo Fighters released their ninth studio album Concrete and Gold, which became the band's second album to debut at number one on the Billboard 200. After the Concrete and Gold Tour, Grohl announced that the band would be taking a break. The tenth Foo Fighters studio album, Medicine at Midnight, was delayed due to the COVID-19 pandemic. It was released on February 5, 2021, and debuted at number three on the Billboard 200. The Medicine at Midnight tour was cancelled following the death of Hawkins on March 25, 2022.

Other work
 Musical projects and contributions 
Apart from his main bands, Grohl has been involved in other music projects. In 1992, he played drums on Buzz Osborne's Kiss-styled solo-EP King Buzzo, where he was credited as Dale Nixon, a pseudonym that Greg Ginn adopted to play bass on Black Flag's My War. He also released the music cassette Pocketwatch under the pseudonym Late! on the now-defunct indie label Simple Machines.

In 1993, Grohl was recruited to help recreate the music of The Beatles' early years for the movie Backbeat; he played drums in an "all-star" lineup that included Greg Dulli of the Afghan Whigs, indie producer Don Fleming, Mike Mills of R.E.M., Thurston Moore of Sonic Youth, and Dave Pirner of Soul Asylum. A music video was filmed for the song "Money" while Grohl was with Nirvana on their 1994 European tour, footage of Grohl was filmed later and included.

Later in 1994, Grohl played drums on two tracks for Mike Watt's Ball-Hog or Tugboat?. In early 1995, Grohl and Foo Fighters played their first US tour, the Ring Spiel Tour both opening for Watt and playing with Eddie Vedder as Watt's supporting band.

In 1997, Grohl played a few songs with David Bowie for Bowie's 50th birthday concert, which was recorded and shown on pay-per-view later that year.

During the early 2000s, Grohl spent time in his basement studio writing and recording a number of songs for a metal project. Over the span of several years, he recruited his favorite metal vocalists from the 1980s, including Lemmy of Motörhead, Conrad "Cronos" Lant from Venom, King Diamond, Scott Weinrich, Snake of Voivod and Max Cavalera of Sepultura, to perform the vocals for the songs. The project was released in 2004 under the nickname Probot.

Also in 2003, Grohl stepped behind the kit to perform on Killing Joke's second self-titled album. The move surprised some Nirvana fans, given that Nirvana had been accused of plagiarizing the opening riff of "Come as You Are" from Killing Joke's 1984 song "Eighties". However, the controversy failed to create a lasting rift between the bands. Foo Fighters covered Killing Joke's "Requiem" during the late 1990s, and were even joined by Killing Joke singer Jaz Coleman for a performance of the song at a show in New Zealand in 2003. Also in 2003, at the 45th Annual Grammy Awards, Grohl performed in an ad hoc supergroup with Bruce Springsteen, Elvis Costello, and Steven Van Zandt for a performance in tribute of then-recently deceased singer/guitarist Joe Strummer.

Grohl lent his drumming skills to other artists during the early 2000s. In 2000, he played drums and sang on a track, "Goodbye Lament", from Tony Iommi's album Iommi. In 2001, Grohl performed on Tenacious D's debut album, and appeared in the video for lead single "Tribute" as a demon. He later appeared in the duo's 2006 movie Tenacious D in The Pick of Destiny as the devil in the song "The Pick of Destiny", and performed on its soundtrack. He also performed drums for their 2012 album Rize of the Fenix. In 2002, Grohl helped Chan Marshall of Cat Power on the album You Are Free and played with Queens of the Stone Age on their album Songs for the Deaf. Grohl also toured with the band in support of the album, delaying work on the Foo Fighters' album One by One. In 2004, Grohl drummed on six tracks for Nine Inch Nails' 2005 album With Teeth and played percussion on one more, later returning to play drums on 'The Idea of You' from their 2016 EP Not the Actual Events. He also drummed on the song "Bad Boyfriend" on Garbage's 2005 album Bleed Like Me. Most recently, he recorded all the drums on Juliette and the Licks's 2006 album Four on the Floor and the song "For Us" from Pete Yorn's 2006 album Nightcrawler. Beyond drumming, Grohl contributed guitar to a cover of Neil Young's "I've Been Waiting For You" on David Bowie's 2002 album Heathen.

In June 2008, Grohl was Paul McCartney's special guest for a concert at the Anfield football stadium in Liverpool, in one of the central events of the English city's year as European Capital of Culture. Grohl joined McCartney's band singing backup vocals and playing guitar on "Band on the Run" and drums on "Back in the U.S.S.R." and "I Saw Her Standing There". Grohl also performed with McCartney at the 51st Annual Grammy Awards, again playing drums on "I Saw Her Standing There". Grohl also helped pay tribute to McCartney at the 2010 Kennedy Center Honors along with No Doubt, Norah Jones, Steven Tyler, James Taylor, and Mavis Staples. He sang a duet version of "Maybe I'm Amazed" with Norah Jones on December 5, 2010.

Grohl played drums on the tracks "Run with the Wolves" and "Stand Up" on The Prodigy's 2009 album Invaders Must Die.

In July 2009, it was revealed that Grohl was recording with Josh Homme and John Paul Jones as Them Crooked Vultures. The trio performed their first show together on August 9, 2009, at Metro in Chicago. The band played their first UK gig on August 26, 2009, with a surprise appearance at Brixton Academy in London, supporting the Arctic Monkeys. The band released their debut album Them Crooked Vultures on November 16, 2009, in the UK and November 17, 2009, in the US.

On October 23, 2010, Grohl performed with Tenacious D at BlizzCon. He appeared as the drummer for the entire concert, and a year later he returned with Foo Fighters and played another set there, this time as guitarist and vocalist.

Also in 2010, Grohl helped write and performed on drums for "Watch This" with guitarist Slash and Duff McKagan on Slash's self-titled album that also included many other famous artists.

In October 2011, Grohl temporarily joined Cage the Elephant as a replacement on tour after drummer Jared Champion's appendix burst.

Grohl directed a documentary entitled Sound City which is about the Van Nuys studio of the same name where Nevermind was recorded that shut down its music operations in 2011.

In 2012, following the departure of Joey Castillo from Queens of the Stone Age, Grohl performed on some tracks as drummer on their 2013 album ...Like Clockwork.

At the 12-12-12 Sandy benefit concert, Paul McCartney joined Grohl and the surviving members of Nirvana (Krist Novoselic and touring guitarist Pat Smear) to perform "Cut Me Some Slack", a song later recorded for the Sound City soundtrack. In what was regarded as a Nirvana reunion with McCartney as a stand-in for Kurt Cobain, this was the first time in eighteen years that the three had played alongside each other.

Grohl delivered a keynote speech at the 2013 South by Southwest conference in Austin Texas, U.S. on the morning of March 14. Lasting just under an hour, the speech covered Grohl's musical life from his youth through to his role with the Foo Fighters and emphasized the importance of each individual's voice, regardless of who the individual is: "There is no right or wrong—there is only your voice ... What matters most is that it's your voice. Cherish it. Respect it. Nurture it. Challenge it. Respect it." Grohl said during the speech that Psy's "Gangnam Style" was one of his favorite songs of the past decade. He also referenced Edgar Winter's instrumental "Frankenstein" as the song that made him want to become a musician.

On November 6, 2013, Grohl played drums at the 2013 CMA Awards replacing drummer Chris Fryar for Country Music band Zac Brown Band. The band debuted their new song "Day for the Dead". Grohl also produced Zac Brown Band's EP The Grohl Sessions, Vol. 1.

Grohl also featured on drums for new indie hip-hop band RDGLDGRN. He worked with them closely on their EP. The group asked fellow Northern Virginia native Grohl, who was filming his Sound City documentary, to drum on "I Love Lamp". Grohl agreed and played drums for the entire record, with the exception of "Million Fans", which features a sampled breakbeat.

Grohl, a fan of theatrical Swedish metal band Ghost, produced their EP If You Have Ghost. He was also featured in a number of songs on the EP. Grohl played rhythm guitar for the song "If You Have Ghosts" (a cover of a Roky Erickson song), and drums on "I'm a Marionette" (an ABBA cover) as well as "Waiting for the Night" (a Depeche Mode cover). According to a member of Ghost, Grohl has appeared live in concert with the band wearing the same identity concealing outfit that the rest of the band usually wears.

In September, the all-star covers album by the Alice Cooper-led Hollywood Vampires supergroup was released and features Grohl playing drums on the medley "One/Jump Into the Fire".

On August 10, 2018, Grohl released "Play", a solo recording lasting over 22 minutes. A mini documentary accompanied it.

Between August and November 2020, Grohl performed in an online drum battle with ten-year-old drummer and YouTube celebrity Nandi Bushell, who had challenged Grohl after previously covering songs from Nirvana and Foo Fighters. Grohl had previously been impressed by her talent and energy. After going back and forth with Bushell a few times, he jokingly conceded victory to her, and later wrote and performed a song in her honor. Later, after speaking to Bushell over a video chat, Grohl offered to have Bushell perform with the Foo Fighters on stage, an offer he made good on when she appeared with the band during their August 26, 2021 show at the L.A. Forum, where she performed drums on "Everlong" as the show's finale. The videos of the drum battle received tens of millions of views.

During Hanukkah of 2020, Grohl collaborated with Greg Kurstin to release previously recorded covers of songs by Jewish artists, one per night. This continued in 2021 and 2022.

On October 5, 2021, Grohl's memoir The Storyteller: Tales of Life and Music was published by Dey Street Books. Grohl developed a thrash metal record for a fictional band named Dream Widow (who self-destructed 25 years ago), as developed for a horror-comedy movie titled Studio 666. Grohl worked to create the Dream Widow album and aimed to release it at the same time as the film, on February 25, 2022. On March 25, 2022, the self-titled Dream Widow EP was released to digital streaming services featuring eight tracks ranging from thrash, death and extreme metal. The EP also featured Rami Jaffee, Jim Rota and Oliver Roman.

On 25 June 2022 Grohl duetted with Paul McCartney when he headlined the Glastonbury Festival. It was his first performance since the death of Taylor Hawkins earlier in the year.

 Television 

Since his first appearance in 1992, Grohl has been a musical guest on Saturday Night Live 14 timesmore than any other musician. He has appeared with Nirvana, Foo Fighters, Them Crooked Vultures, Mick Jagger, and Tom Petty and the Heartbreakers.

Grohl has also appeared in several sketches on SNL. On October 13, 2007, he performed in the SNL Digital Short "People Getting Punched Just Before Eating". On February 6, 2010, he appeared as a middle-aged punk rock drummer reuniting the group "Crisis of Conformity" (fronted by Fred Armisen) after 25 years in a skit later on in the episode. On March 9, 2011, he appeared in the SNL Digital Short "Helen Mirren's Magical Bosom" and the sketch "Bongo's Clown Room".

In August 2000, Grohl voiced Daniel Dotson, an egotistical art instructor, in Is It Fall Yet?, the first of two film-length installments for MTV's animated series Daria.

In mid-2010, Grohl added his name to the list of contributing rock star voice cameos for Cartoon Network's heavy metal parody/tribute show, Metalocalypse. He voiced the controversial Syrian dictator, Abdule Malik in the season 3 finale, Doublebookedklok.

In February 2013, Grohl filled in as host of Chelsea Lately for a week. Guests included Elton John, who disclosed on the E! show that he would appear with Grohl on the next Queens of the Stone Age album. Grohl had previously hosted the show during the first week of December 2012 as part of "Celebrity Guest Host Week".

On May 20, 2015, David Letterman selected Grohl and the Foo Fighters to play "Everlong" as the last musical guest on the final episode of Late Show with David Letterman. Letterman stated that he considered "Everlong" to be his favorite song and that he and the band were "joined at the hip" ever since the band canceled tour dates to play his first show back from heart bypass surgery at his request.

On December 1, 2015, Grohl appeared on an episode of The Muppets where he competed in a "drum off" with Animal.

Grohl appeared in the 50th anniversary season of Sesame Street in February 2019.

On January 28, 2021, it was announced that the first authorized Dave Grohl documentary will be released via The Coda Collection. The documentary was released April 30, 2021, as What Drives Us.

On 8 October 2021, Grohl was the guest storyteller on CBeebies Bedtime Story, reading a story based on The Beatles song, Octopus's Garden.

 Filmmaking 
Grohl directed the Foo Fighters music videos for "Monkey Wrench" (1997), "My Hero" (1998), "All My Life" (2002), "White Limo" (2011), and "Rope" (2011), as well as all the music videos from the Sonic Highways and Concrete and Gold era. Outside of Foo Fighters, he also filmed the music video for Soundgarden's "By Crooked Steps" (2014).

In 2013, Grohl produced and directed the documentary Sound City, about the history of the famed Sound City Studios recording studios in Van Nuys. The film, Grohl's feature-length directorial debut, premiered at the 2013 Sundance Film Festival.

Accompanying the release of Sonic Highways, Grohl directed an eight-part documentary miniseries of the same name that chronicles the album's development and recording across eight different American cities. It premiered on HBO on October 17, 2014.

In 2021, Grohl directed What Drives Us, a feature-length documentary on van touring. It was released on April 30, 2021, on the Coda Collection via Amazon Prime.

Cal Jam
Inspired by California Jam, to celebrate the release of Foo Fighters' ninth studio album Concrete and Gold and begin their North American tour, Cal Jam 17, a music festival curated by Grohl and Foo Fighters, was held from October 67, 2017 at Glen Helen Amphitheater, with 27,800 attendees, 3,100 campers, and nine arrests.

Cal Jam 18 was held October 5–6, 2018 in San Bernardino, California which featured the Foo Fighters and a Nirvana reunion.

 Musicianship and equipment 

Grohl is a self-taught musician and cannot read music, and instead plays only by ear. Grohl's two primary guitars are based on the Gibson ES-335. His primary recording guitar is an original cherry red Gibson Trini Lopez Standard that he bought in the early 1990s because he liked the look of the diamond-shaped sound holes. He also has an original Pelham blue Trini Lopez from 1965 which he bought from a doctor in the UK.

Grohl's primary stage guitar is his signature model Pelham Blue Gibson DG-335, which was designed by Gibson based on the Trini Lopez Standard specs, but in a different color and with a stop tailpiece instead of the Trini Lopez's trapeze tailpiece. He also has another signature guitar called the "Memphis Dave Grohl ES-335" in silver finish that is otherwise similar to the DG-335. Grohl uses D'Addario 0.11-0.49 gauge strings, but his playing style is so aggressive that he uses a 0.42 gauge for the A string and a 0.60 gauge for the low E string. His primary acoustic guitar is a black Elvis Presley model Gibson Dove.

Grohl's drum kit, as designed by Drum Workshop, features five different sized toms ranging from 5x8 inches to 16x18 inches, a 19-inch crash cymbal, two 20-inch crash cymbals, an 18-inch China cymbal, a 24-inch ride cymbal, and a standard kick drum, snare drum, and hi-hat.

 Advocacy, philanthropy and views 
In May 2006, Grohl sent a note of support to the two trapped miners in the Beaconsfield mine collapse in Tasmania, Australia, who had survived the initial rockfall. In the initial days following the collapse, one of the men requested an iPod with the Foo Fighters album In Your Honor to be sent to them. Deal?" In October 2006, one of the miners took up his offer, joining Grohl for a drink after a Foo Fighters acoustic concert at the Sydney Opera House. Grohl wrote an instrumental piece for the meeting, which he pledged to include on the band's next album. The song, "Ballad of the Beaconsfield Miners", appears on Foo Fighters' 2007 release Echoes, Silence, Patience & Grace, and features Kaki King.

Grohl is an advocate for LGBT rights. He has worn a White Knot ribbon, a symbol of support for same-sex marriage, to various events; when questioned about the knot, he responded, "I believe in love and I believe in equality and I believe in marriage equality." Grohl's gay rights activism dates back to the early 1990s, when Nirvana performed at a benefit to raise money to fight Oregon Ballot Measure 9, which forbade governments in Oregon from promoting or facilitating homosexuality. Grohl has also participated in two counter-protests against the Westboro Baptist Church for their anti-gay stance, once by performing "Keep It Clean" on the back of a flatbed truck and most recently by Rickrolling them.

Grohl is an advocate for gun control. Shortly after the 2002 D.C. sniper attacks ended, he stated in an interview that the attacks were "an indication of the direction the country's heading in if we don't get tougher with gun laws". He further stated, "People need to realize that our country has to get tougher on gun laws, it just does, and I grew up in suburban Virginia going hunting in season. I grew up with a firearm myself. But I'd be willing to give it up, if everyone else would."

In a 2008 interview, Grohl said he had never taken cocaine, heroin, or speed, and that he had stopped smoking cannabis and taking LSD at the age of 20. He said, "I've seen people die. It ain't easy being young, but that stuff doesn't make it any easier." He contributed to a 2009 anti-drug video for the BBC. He has described himself as a coffee addict who drinks an average of six cups of coffee every morning; in 2009, he was admitted to a hospital with chest pains caused by a caffeine overdose.

Grohl supported Barack Obama's 2012 presidential campaign and performed "My Hero" at the 2012 Democratic National Convention in Charlotte, North Carolina. Foo Fighters supported Joe Biden's 2020 presidential campaign and played at the "Celebrating America" concert on the day of Biden's inauguration in 2021.

 Personal life 
In 1994, Grohl married Jennifer Leigh Youngblood, a photographer from Grosse Pointe, Michigan. They separated in December 1996 and divorced in 1997. On August 2, 2003, he married Jordyn Blum. They reside in Los Angeles and have three children, born in 2006, 2009 and 2014.

With a fortune of $260 million at the time, Grohl was estimated by a 2012 Stereogum article to be the third wealthiest drummer in the world, behind Ringo Starr and Phil Collins.

In a June 2011 interview, Grohl revealed that he was going deaf in his left ear due to decades of performing on stage. During his appearance on The Howard Stern Show in February 2022, he stated that he suffers from hearing loss and that this has an impact on both his daily life and life as a musician; his tinnitus has forced him to read lips for about 20 years, a situation which became more difficult when people began wearing face masks during the COVID-19 pandemic. As for producing music, he refuses to use in-ear monitors despite their ability to protect his ears because it "removes [him] from the natural atmosphere sound so [he] cannot hear [his] bandmates". He said that his ears are "still tuned in to certain frequencies, meaning [he's] still able to pick up on minute sonic details—even down to the slightest differences between cymbal crashes".

 Honors 

In August 2009, Grohl was given the key to the city of Warren, Ohio, his birthplace, and performed the songs "Everlong", "Times Like These", and "My Hero". A roadway in downtown Warren named "David Grohl Alley" has been dedicated to him with murals by local artists.

Grohl's hometown of Warren unveiled gigantic  drumsticks in 2012 to honor him. According to The Hollywood Reporter, the massive pair broke the Guinness World Record. The record-breaking drumsticks were shown to the public for the first time on July 7 during a concert at the Warren Amphitheater.

On November 11, 2014, Grohl joined Bruce Springsteen and Zac Brown on stage at the Concert for Valor in Washington, D.C. to support U.S. troops and veterans.

Grohl's first solo Rolling Stone'' cover story was published on December 4, 2014.

Discography

Filmography

Film

Television

Bibliography

References

Further reading

External links 

  (Foo Fighters)
 
 Dave Grohl's Gearboard
 Dave Grohl Band Discography
 Live Review at ArtistDirect.com
 

 
1969 births
Living people
20th-century American drummers
20th-century American guitarists
20th-century American singers
21st-century American drummers
21st-century American singers
Alternative rock drummers
Alternative rock guitarists
Alternative rock singers
American alternative rock musicians
American autobiographers
American documentary filmmakers
American heavy metal drummers
American heavy metal guitarists
American heavy metal singers
American male drummers
American male guitarists
American male singers
American male songwriters
American multi-instrumentalists
American music video directors
American people of German descent
American people of Irish descent
American people of Slovak descent
American philanthropists
American punk rock drummers
American punk rock guitarists
American punk rock singers
American rock drummers
American rock guitarists
American rock singers
American rock songwriters
Annandale High School alumni
Film directors from Ohio
Film directors from Virginia
Foo Fighters members
Grammy Award winners
Grunge musicians
Guitarists from Ohio
Guitarists from Virginia
Killing Joke members
American LGBT rights activists
Mondo Generator members
Musicians from Alexandria, Virginia
Nirvana (band) members
NME Awards winners
Ohio Democrats
People from Springfield, Virginia
People from Warren, Ohio
Queens of the Stone Age members
Record producers from Ohio
Record producers from Virginia
Rhythm guitarists
Scream (band) members
Singers from Ohio
Singers from Virginia
Songwriters from Ohio
Songwriters from Virginia
Teenage Time Killers members
Them Crooked Vultures members